Cartter is both a surname and a given name. 
Notable people with the name include:

Surname 
David Kellogg Cartter (1812–1887), American diplomat,  federal judge and U.S. Representative from Ohio
Harley High Cartter (1810–1874), American jurist

Given name 
Thomas Cartter Lupton (1899–1977), American heir and businessman
Zeboim Cartter Patten (1840–1925), American industrialist, capitalist and American Civil War captain

See also
Carter (name)